Rkia Damsiria (born January 1, 1948) is a Moroccan Berber singer and poet. She writes and performs in Tashelhit, her native Berber tongue.

Biography 
Rkia Chewal or Damsiria was born in 1948 in Demsira, a town near Chichaoua, Morocco. She had a difficult childhood because she lost her mother at the age of 4, was maltreated by her father's wife and forced to marry. Soon after, she fled to the city of Casablanca before she turned 14.

While in Casablanca, she started singing and her beginning was in the middle of 1960s with some of the most popular Amazigh rwaiss artists at that time such as Mohamed Demsiri and Said Achtouk. She recorded her first album in 1967 and soon after, she became very popular in Morocco and among Moroccans in Europe.

Concert tour 
She participated in several national festivals in Morocco such as Timitar.

Discography 
Rkia Damsiria has a rich discography with around 800 songs.

See also 
 Shilha language
 Fatima Tabaamrant
 Aicha Tachinwit

References 

1948 births
20th-century Moroccan poets
21st-century Moroccan poets
20th-century Moroccan women singers
21st-century Moroccan women singers
Berber Moroccans
Berber musicians
Living people
Shilha people